Radwan Al Azhar (born 12 May 1979) is a Syrian football goalkeeper. He played in the Syrian Premier League and for the Syrian national football team.

International career
Al Azhar has been a regular for the Syria national football team since 2005.

Honours

National team
West Asian Games 2005: Runner-up

References

External links 
 
 

1979 births
Living people
Sportspeople from Damascus
Syrian footballers
Association football goalkeepers
Syria international footballers
Al-Majd players
Al-Wahda SC (Syria) players
Al-Jaish Damascus players
2011 AFC Asian Cup players
Syrian Premier League players